Boris Milivojević (born 26 November 1971) is a Serbian actor. Since his debut in 1983, Milivojević has garnered critical and commercial success for his roles in theatre and film. He has had lead roles in high-profile Serbian films, including Munje! (2001), When I Grow Up, I'll Be a Kangaroo (2004), The Red Colored Grey Truck (2005), We Are Not Angels 3: Rock & Roll Strike Back (2006), The Fourth Man (2007) St. George Shoots the Dragon (2009) and Monument to Michael Jackson (2014), and has composed a wide palette of critically acclaimed theatre roles in Hamlet, Timon of Athens, King Lear, Macbeth, Antigone and Noises Off! in theatres in Eastern Europe.

He is a recipient of numerous accolades for his activity in Serbian film, theatre and television, including a Zoran Radmilović Award, two Ardalion Awards, three Serbian Oscars of Popularity, and a Golden Arena for Best Actor nomination.

Biography
Milivojević was born in Belgrade to Serbian parents Radiša and Bojana Milivojević. He began his career in 1983 with supporting roles in Mahovina na asfaltu and Idi mi, dođi mi. His first critically defined role was as protagonist Tungi in Zaboravljeni.

During the nineties, he was notable for memorable supporting characters in films including The Black Bomber (1992), Pretty Village, Pretty Flame (1996) and The Dagger (1999). In 2016, he performed in HNK Zagreb as Guildenstern in Hamlet.

He received a Miloš Žutić Award nomination for his Shakespearean interpretation of Edgar in the Branislav Zeremski-directed version of King Lear in 2014, and a Zoran Radmilović Award for his role as Macbeth in Macbeth in 2017. For his portrayal of and  Mare in Munje! (2001), he received a Golden Arena for Best Actor nomination.

Milivojević is active within reality television, appearing in the first season of the Serbian version of Your Face Sounds Familiar, where he qualified for the finals and reached 4th place out of 10; and hosting the quiz show Zlatni krug  from 2015 to 2018.

He is also prominent within voice work in Serbian movie dubs. He voiced protagonist Jovan Vu in the 2009 Serbian-based animated film Technotise: Edit & I, and has voiced Puss in Boots in the Serbian dub of the Shrek franchise, Mike Wazowski in the Serbian Monsters Inc. films, King Julien in the Serbian Madagascar films, Grand Master Oogway in the Serbian Kung Fu Panda film series and Ed the hyena in the Serbian The Lion King, among other roles. He did not reprise his role as Puss in Boots in the dub of the 2011 Academy Award-nominated spinoff, with the character being voiced by colleague and friend Marko Živić in the sequel feature.

Filmography

Film roles

Television roles

Serbian movie voice dubs

References

External links 

1971 births
Living people
Male actors from Belgrade
Serbian comedians
Serbian male voice actors
Serbian male film actors
Serbian male Shakespearean actors
Zoran Radmilović Award winners
Serbian television presenters
Serbian male television actors
Serbian theatre directors
Serbian stage actors
Theatre people from Belgrade